Shame is a psychological condition. 

Shame or Ashamed may also refer to:

Arts, entertainment, and media

Films

Ashamed 
 Ashamed (1950 film), a 1950 Iranian drama film directed by Esmail Kushan
 Ashamed (2010 film), a 2010 Korean queer film directed by Kim Soo-hyeon

Shame 
 Shame (1917 film), a 1917 American drama film directed by John W. Noble
 Shame (1921 film), a 1921 American silent film directed by Emmett J. Flynn
 Shame (1922 film), a 1922 German silent drama film
 Shame, reissued title of the 1962 American film The Intruder directed by Roger Corman
 Shame (1968 film), a 1968 drama Swedish film directed by Ingmar Bergman
 Shame (1988 film), a 1988 Australian film directed by Steve Jodrell
 Shame (2011 film), a 2011 drama British-American film directed by Steve McQueen
 Shame (2013 film), a Russian-language film about the Kursk Russian submarine disaster

Television
 Skam (TV series) (En: Shame), a 2015 Norwegian drama series created by Julie Andem
 Shame (TV series), an American remake of the Norwegian series above
 "Shame" (Malcolm in the Middle), a 2000 episode of the American sitcom series Malcolm in the Middle
 "Shame", a 2011 episode of Prime Suspect

Literature
 Shame (Alvtegen novel), a 2005 novel by Karin Alvtegen
 Shame (Rushdie novel), a 1983 novel by Salman Rushdie
 Lajja (novel) (En: Shame), a 1993 novel in Bengali by Taslima Nasrin

Music
 Shame (band), a British post-punk band

Albums and EPs
 Shame (Brad album), 1993
 Shame (EP), a 2012 EP by Freddie Gibbs and Madlib
 Shame (Trash Talk album), 2009
 Shame (Uniform album), 2020

Songs
 "Shame" (Drowning Pool song), 2009
 "Shame" (Eurythmics song), 1987
 "Shame" (Evelyn "Champagne" King song), 1978
 "Shame" (Monrose song), 2006
 "Shame" (The Motels song), 1985
 "Shame" (Orchestral Manoeuvres in the Dark song), 1987
 "Shame" (Stabbing Westward song), 1996
 "Shame" (Tyrese song), 2015
 "Shame" (Keith Urban song), 2013
 "Shame" (Robbie Williams and Gary Barlow song), 2010
 "Shame", a song by Adam Lambert from The Original High, 2015
 "Shame", a song by Depeche Mode from Construction Time Again, 1983
 "Shame", a song by Bill Fay for 1,000 Days, 1,000 Songs, 2017
 "Shame", a song by the Gigolo Aunts from Flippin' Out, 1993
 "Shame", a song by PJ Harvey from Uh Huh Her, 2004
 "Shame", a song by Matchbox 20 from Yourself or Someone Like You, 1996
 "Shame", a song by Randy Newman from Bad Love, 1999
 "Shame", a song by Peakboy from Portrait, 2018
 "Shame", a song by Seam from Headsparks, 1992
 "Shame", a song by The Smashing Pumpkins from Adore, 1998
 "Shame", a song by Stabbing Westward from Wither Blister Burn & Peel, 1996
 "Shame", a song by the Young Fathers from White Men Are Black Men Too, 2015
 "Shame Shame", a song by The Magic Lanterns, 1968
 "Shame, Shame, Shame" (Shirley & Company song), 1974
 "The Shame", a song by Dramatis, 1982
 "The Shame", a song by Levellers from We the Collective, 2018

Other uses in arts, entertainment, and media
 Shame, an enemy of Batman's

See also
 Shame, Shame, Shame (disambiguation)
 Shames (disambiguation)
 Shameless (disambiguation)